Statistics of Austrian Staatsliga in the 1959–60 season.

Overview
It was contested by 14 teams, and SK Rapid Wien won the championship.

League standings

Results

References
Austria - List of final tables (RSSSF)

Austrian Football Bundesliga seasons
Austria
1959–60 in Austrian football